Henry Jackson Thomas (born September 9, 1971) is an American actor. He began his career as a child actor and had a lead role in the film E.T. the Extra-Terrestrial (1982), for which he won a Young Artist Award and received Golden Globe Award, BAFTA Award, and Saturn Award nominations. Thomas also had roles in Cloak & Dagger (1984), Fire in the Sky (1993), Legends of the Fall (1994), Suicide Kings (1997), All the Pretty Horses (2000), Gangs of New York (2002), 11:14 (2003), and Dear John (2010). Thomas was nominated for the Golden Globe Award for Best Supporting Actor – Series, Miniseries or Television Film for his role in the television film Indictment: The McMartin Trial (1997).

More recently, Thomas collaborated with filmmaker Mike Flanagan, appearing in the films Ouija: Origin of Evil (2016), Gerald's Game (2017) and Doctor Sleep (2019) as well as the television series The Haunting of Hill House (2018) and its follow-up series The Haunting of Bly Manor (2020), the former of which earned him a Saturn Award. In 2021, he had a main role in Flanagan's horror series Midnight Mass.

Early life 
Thomas was born in San Antonio, Texas. He attended East Central High School and Blinn College.

Career

Acting 
Thomas struggled with the popularity he gained in the months following the release of E.T. the Extra-Terrestrial. In November 2019, Thomas reprised his role as Elliott for an Xfinity & Sky UK commercial, in which E.T. returns to visit a now-adult Elliott and his family for the holidays.

Since 2016, Thomas has worked frequently with filmmaker Mike Flanagan, appearing in his films Ouija: Origin of Evil, Gerald's Game and Doctor Sleep, as well as in the Netflix horror series The Haunting of Hill House, which Flanagan created and directed. Thomas also has a role in Flanagan's follow up to The Haunting of Hill House, The Haunting of Bly Manor, and Flanagan's mini-series Midnight Mass.

Thomas worked in Stargirl portraying Doctor Mid-Nite and voicing his A.I. counterpart "Chuck" until the latter role was recast with Alex Collins in season two.

Music 
Thomas wrote songs and played guitar for a San Antonio band, The  Blue Heelers (named for the breed of dog), in the 1990s. Although the band was not signed to a record label, it self-produced an album, Twister. Thomas continued to write and record songs. In 1998, his song "Truckstop Coffee" (recorded with the Blue Heelers) appeared on V2's soundtrack for Niagara, Niagara. In 2003, Thomas and Nikki Sudden collaborated on the music for Mika Kaurismäki's film Honey Baby, which featured four original songs written and performed by Thomas as the fictional musician Tom Brackett. An album was in the works, but Sudden died unexpectedly in 2006.

Personal life 
Thomas married actress Marie Zielcke on May 10, 2004. They had a daughter, Hazel. The couple were divorced in 2007. Thomas also has two children with his current wife Annalee, and in 2014 moved to Wilsonville, Oregon. During the "Flanaverse Reunion" panel at 2022's "Season's Screamings" horror festival, Thomas acknowledged that he and actress Alex Essoe, his costar in Mike Flanagan's Doctor Sleep, have been romantically involved for some time now.

Filmography

Film

Television

Awards and nominations

Other honors 
 VH1's "100 Greatest Kid Stars"
 2005, ranked #4, E!'s "50 Cutest Child Stars All Grown-up"
 2013, inducted into the Texas Film Hall of Fame.

References

Bibliography 
 Holmstrom, John. The Moving Picture Boy: An International Encyclopaedia from 1895 to 1995, Norwich, Michael Russell, 1996, pp. 387–388.

External links 
 Yahoo! Role Recall:Henry Thomas remembers teary E.T. audition
 
 

American male child actors
American male film actors
American male television actors
Living people
Male actors from San Antonio
Musicians from San Antonio
20th-century American male actors
21st-century American musicians
21st-century American male actors
21st-century American male musicians
People from Wilsonville, Oregon
1971 births